Malhuwala may refer to:

 Malhuwala, Firozpur tehsil, a village in Firozpur tehsil of Punjab, India
 Malhuwala (34421), a village in Zira tehsil of Punjab, India
 Malhuwala (34397), a village in Zira tehsil of Punjab, India